Neil Konzen is a computer programmer who formerly worked for Microsoft as one of its earliest employees. He was the systems programmer of Microsoft's Macintosh programs projects, including MultiPlan and Word for the Mac in 1984. He was later tasked with leading the team that created the second version of Windows at Microsoft, after the failure of the original version.

Konzen is also known for creating, with Bill Gates, the DONKEY.BAS game for the IBM PC.

Konzen also worked in the Ferrari F1 Racing Team around the Todt-Brawn-Schumacher era, when software development still was a major competitive advantage for the top teams. He created Vehicle Dynamics Simulation (VDS) software that could run real-time simulations at the home factory and at the track-side, during the race weekend, on the limited computational power of Personal Computers available back then. The software included features that became available on commercial software for PCs, like MATLAB, only many years later. He was also instrumental in the implementation of the real-time telemetry and contributed to other softwares developed in the Ferrari F1 Racing Team.

Prior to his work at Microsoft, Konzen created the popular G.P.L.E. (Global Program Line Editor) for writing Applesoft programs on the Apple II.

Not working for Microsoft, but still in Washington, he currently resides in Bellevue, Washington.

References

Living people
Year of birth missing (living people)
Microsoft employees
Microsoft Windows people
Place of birth missing (living people)